The International Institute of Public Finance, or IIPF, is a global organization of economists specializing in public finance. It was founded in Paris in 1937.

References

External links
IIPF Website

Public finance
Research institutes in Munich